Michaël Belkacem Fabre (born 15 July 1984) is an Algerian former professional footballer who played as a goalkeeper.

Early life
Fabre was born on 15 July 1984 in Draguignan, France, to Mohamed Belkacem and Veronique Fabre, a father of Algerian origin and a French mother. His father is a native of Oran.

International career

France
Fabre represented France in international competition at the junior level and was part of the France U17 national team that won the 2001 FIFA U-17 World Championship in Trinidad and Tobago. He was also a member of the French U21 that won the 2004 edition of the Toulon Tournament.

Algeria
Being of Algerian descent, Fabre was also eligible to represent Algeria and expressed his desire to do so. On 18 July 2011, newly appointed Algeria manager, Vahid Halilhodžić, called up Fabre to the Algeria national team for a five-day training camp in Marcoussis, France. On 10 August 2011, he made his unofficial debut for the team, participating in an intra-squad match by replacing Raïs M'Bolhi at halftime.

References

External links

1984 births
Living people
Algerian people of French descent
Sportspeople from Var (department)
French sportspeople of Algerian descent
Algerian footballers
French footballers
Footballers from Provence-Alpes-Côte d'Azur
Association football goalkeepers
France under-21 international footballers
France youth international footballers
Ligue 2 players
Championnat National players
Championnat National 2 players
Championnat National 3 players
Bologna F.C. 1909 players
ACF Fiorentina players
CS Sedan Ardennes players
Clermont Foot players
RC Lens players
MC Alger players
Athlético Marseille players
US Boulogne players
ÉFC Fréjus Saint-Raphaël players
Algerian expatriate footballers
Algerian expatriate sportspeople in Italy
Expatriate footballers in Italy